Craig Brittain (born 10 January 1974) is a Scottish former footballer.  He began his career with Glasgow junior side Ashfield before turning 'senior' with Dumbarton.  He spent the best part of 11 seasons with Dumbarton and was part of the promotion winning side of 2001-02

References

1974 births
Scottish footballers
Dumbarton F.C. players
Scottish Football League players
Living people
Footballers from Glasgow

Association football defenders